George Evans Stewart (August 2, 1872 – March 2, 1946) was an officer in the United States Army and a Medal of Honor recipient for his actions in the Philippine–American War. He later commanded the 339th Infantry Regiment and the American Expeditionary Force in northern Russia.

Stewart joined the army from New York City in October 1896, and retired with the rank of colonel in April 1931.

Medal of Honor citation
Rank and organization: Second Lieutenant, 19th U.S. Infantry. Place and date: At Passi, Island of Panay, Philippine Islands, November 26, 1899. Entered service at: New York, N.Y. Birth: New South Wales. Date of issue: June 26, 1900.

Citation:

While crossing a river in face of the enemy, this officer plunged in and at the imminent risk of his own life saved from drowning an enlisted man of his regiment.

See also

List of Medal of Honor recipients
List of Philippine–American War Medal of Honor recipients

References

External links

Arlington National Cemetery

1872 births
1946 deaths
Military personnel from New South Wales
People from New South Wales
Military personnel from New York City
American military personnel of the Philippine–American War
United States Army Medal of Honor recipients
Foreign-born Medal of Honor recipients
Philippine–American War recipients of the Medal of Honor
United States Army colonels
American military personnel of the Russian Civil War
Burials at Arlington National Cemetery
United States Army personnel of World War I